Thirteen United States presidents have made presidential visits to Southern Europe. Woodrow Wilson became the first incumbent president to visit a Southern European country in January 1919 in the aftermath of World War I. Visits occurring during the 1940s through 1980s were offshoots of American diplomatic interactions during World War II and then the Cold War.

To date, 32 visits have been made to Italy, 20 Vatican City, 11 to Spain, eight to Portugal, four to Greece, three to Bosnia and Herzegovina, three to Malta, three to Slovenia, two to Croatia, two to Kosovo, one to Albania, and one to Macedonia (now known as North Macedonia). Three were also made to Yugoslavia prior to its breakup during the early 1990s. Of the present-day nations in (or partly within) the region, all but Cyprus, San Marino, Andorra, Montenegro, and Serbia have been visited by a sitting American president.

Table of visits

Visits of former presidents
Martin Van Buren and Millard Fillmore each met (separately) with Pope Pius IX in Rome in 1855, as did Franklin Pierce in November 1857. Ulysses S. Grant met with Pope Leo XIII in the Vatican in 1878, during a world tour after leaving the presidency.

Theodore Roosevelt sought an audience with Pope Pius X in April 1910 while in Rome. The Pope agreed to see him, provided Roosevelt would not call on some Methodist missionaries in Rome. Roosevelt had no intention of meeting the missionaries, but he declined to submit to the pope's conditions and the interview did not take place.

Former presidents George H. W. Bush and Bill Clinton accompanied President George W. Bush to the funeral of Pope John Paul II in April 2005.

See also
 Foreign policy of the United States
 Stability Pact for South Eastern Europe
 Catholic Church and politics in the United States
 List of meetings between the pope and the president of the United States

References

Albania–United States relations
Bosnia and Herzegovina–United States relations
Croatia–United States relations
Greece–United States relations
Kosovo–United States relations
North Macedonia–United States relations
Montenegro–United States relations
Serbia–United States relations
Slovenia–United States relations
Lists of United States presidential visits
Italy–United States relations
Spain–United States relations
Portugal–United States relations
Holy See–United States relations
Cyprus–United States relations
Malta–United States relations
San Marino–United States relations
Andorra–United States relations